Kalakh is a village in Ludhiana district, Punjab, India.

  
Villages in Ludhiana district